Sally O'Reilly (born 1971) is a writer, critic, teacher and editor. She publishes and distributes text in conventional and expanded forms, from art magazines to performance lectures to opera. Her divergent subject matter contributes to an ongoing investigation into how knowledge is generated, obtained and expressed.

O'Reilly has contributed to Art Monthly, Contemporary Magazine, Frieze, Cabinet, Modern Painters, and Time Out, and has written catalogue essays for numerous international art exhibitions. Her book The Body in Contemporary Art was published by Thames and Hudson in 2009, and Mark Wallinger by Tate Publishing in 2015. She was Writer in Residence at the Whitechapel Art Gallery in 2010/11, is a tutor at Royal College of Art, London, and teaches at various other universities around the UK.

O'Reilly co-edited Implicasphere , a broadsheet periodical published twice a year and distributed within Cabinet magazine, which sought to
<blockquote>unearth and revive compelling, illuminating and curious ideas in the form of image and text fragments taken unadulterated from fields as diverse as folk craft, nuclear physics, metaphysical poetry, pulp novels, linguistics, criminology, film noir and astrology. Cathy Haynes and Sally O'Reilly, Implicaspere, An Itinerary of Meandering Thought Implicasphere Retrieved on January 15th 2007</blockquote>

O'Reilly co-curated the Hayward Gallery Touring Exhibition Magic Show, with Jonathan Allen and was producer and co-writer of The Last of the Red Wine, a radio sitcom based in the artworld devised and performed at the ICA, London, 2011.

She wrote the libretto for the opera The Virtues of Things in collaboration with British composer Matt Rogers. The piece was commissioned by the Royal Opera House, Aldeburgh Music and Opera North, directed by Bijan Sheibani and performed in May 2015. It deals with themes of abstraction and representation, technological modernisation and the powerful influence of objects on humans. In 2016 the Henry Moore Institute dedicated an issue of its journal Essays on Sculpture to the opera.

 References 

 Bibliography 

 The Ambivalents'' (New York: Cabinet Books, 2017). 

1971 births
Living people
British art critics
British curators